Lt. General Etienne Baele (29 April 1891 – 1975) was chief of staff of the Belgian army and chairman of the NATO Military Committee from 1951 to 1952.

References

External links 

http://www.generals.dk/general/Baele/Etienne/Belgium.html

Belgian Army officers
1891 births
1975 deaths
NATO military personnel